The 2013–14 Football League Championship (referred to as the Sky Bet Championship for sponsorship reasons) was the tenth season of the Football League Championship under its current title, the twenty-first season under its current league division format and marked the 125th anniversary of the Football League's inaugural season. The season started on 3 August 2013 and finished on 3 May 2014, with all matches on the final day kicking off simultaneously.

Changes from last season

Team changes
The following teams changed divisions after the 2012–13 season.

To Championship
Promoted from League One
 AFC Bournemouth
 Doncaster Rovers
 Yeovil Town
Relegated from Premier League
 Queens Park Rangers 
 Reading
 Wigan Athletic

From Championship
Relegated to League One
 Bristol City
 Peterborough United
 Wolverhampton Wanderers
Promoted to Premier League
 Cardiff City
 Crystal Palace
 Hull City

Rule changes

Changes to the Championship's financial fair play system allow clubs: 
 Acceptable losses of £3 million during the 2013–14 season (down from £4 million during the 2012–13 season)
 Acceptable shareholder equity investment of £5 million during the 2013–14 season (down from £6 million during the 2012–13 season).
 Sanctions for exceeding the allowances take effect from the set of accounts relating to the 2013–14 season which are due to be submitted on 1 December 2014.

Teams
Of the 24 participating teams, eighteen remain following the 2012–13 Football League Championship. They are joined by three teams promoted from the 2012–13 Football League One and three relegated from the 2012–13 Premier League.

On 20 April 2013, Bournemouth were promoted to the Championship after Brentford's 1–1 draw with Hartlepool. A week later, Doncaster were promoted as champions of League One after scoring a late goal against Brentford. This pushed Bournemouth down to second place. On 19 May, Yeovil Town won promotion by beating Brentford in the 2013 Football League One play-off final.

On 28 April 2013, Queens Park Rangers and Reading were both relegated from the Premier League after a goalless draw against each other. On 14 May, Wigan Athletic were relegated from the Premier League after a 4–1 defeat at Arsenal.

Team overview

Stadium and locations

Source: Football Ground Guide.

Personnel and sponsoring

 1 According to current revision of List of English Football League managers

Managerial changes

League table

Play-offs

Results

Season statistics

Top scorers

 - includes 2 goals in the play-offs

Penalties

- includes 1 penalty in the play-offs

Hat-tricks

 4 Player scored 4 goals

Scoring
First goal: Danny Ings for Burnley against Bolton Wanderers (3 August 2013)
Fastest goal: 15 seconds, David Goodwillie for Blackpool against Derby County (8 April 2014)
Widest winning margin: 6 goals
Sheffield Wednesday 6–0 Leeds United (11 January 2014)
Reading 7–1 Bolton Wanderers (18 January 2014)
Highest scoring game: 8 goals
Derby County 4–4 Ipswich Town (1 October 2013)
Leicester City 5–3 Bolton Wanderers (29 December 2013)
Reading 7–1 Bolton Wanderers (18 January 2014)
Most goals scored in a match by a single team: 7 goals
Reading 7–1 Bolton Wanderers (18 January 2014)
Most goals scored in a match by a losing team: 3 goals
Leicester City 5–3 Bolton Wanderers (29 December 2013)
Blackburn Rovers 4–3 Wigan Athletic (3 May 2014)

Abandoned games
Charlton Athletic 1–3 Doncaster Rovers (24 August 2013) ~  Charlton Athletic 2–0 Doncaster Rovers (Replay) 
Sheffield Wednesday 0–1 Wigan Athletic (18 December 2013)  ~  Sheffield Wednesday 0–3 Wigan Athletic (Replay)

Monthly awards

Transfers

References 

 
EFL Championship seasons
1
2
Eng